Bruce Gant (born September 26, 1956) is a Canadian retired soccer player who spent five seasons in the North American Soccer League.

Gant attended Simon Fraser University, playing on the men's soccer team. He was a 1976 First Team NAIA All American with the Clan.  In 1979, the Portland Timbers selected Gant, brother of Timbers midfielder Brian Gant, in the first round of the North American Soccer League draft.  He remained with the Timbers until they folded in 1982, playing four outdoor and two indoor seasons with them.  In 1983, he played one game for the Montreal Manic.

In 1973, Bruce won a gold medal with British Columbia at the Canada Games. From February to June 1976, Bruce played for Canada in preparation for the Olympic Games. While he played in eight exhibition matches against local sides, he did not make any international appearances and was not selected to the final team.

In 1990, Bruce helped Vancouver Firefighters FC win The Challenge Trophy.

Personal

Bruce's brother Brian Gant was also a professional and international soccer player. His brother-in-law Bill Sinclair played in the Pacific Coast League while his niece Christine Sinclair is a star Canadian player for Portland Thorns FC.

References

Sources

NASL stats

1956 births
Living people
Association football defenders
Canadian expatriate sportspeople in the United States
Canadian expatriate soccer players
Canadian soccer players
Expatriate soccer players in the United States
Montreal Manic players
North American Soccer League (1968–1984) indoor players
North American Soccer League (1968–1984) players
Sportspeople from Burnaby
Soccer players from Portland, Oregon
Portland Timbers (1975–1982) players
Simon Fraser Clan men's soccer players
Soccer people from British Columbia